Covelo is a census-designated place (CDP) in Mendocino County, California, United States. The population was 1,394 at the 2020 census, up from 1,255 at the 2010 census.  of Covelo is part of the Round Valley Indian Reservation.

Geography
It is accessible via California State Route 162, which leads southwest  to U.S. Route 101 at Longvale. To the east, Mendocino Pass Road (becoming Alder Springs Road) leads  over the mountains of Mendocino National Forest to Elk Creek, for much of its length a gravel road.

Covelo and Round Valley are drained by Mill Creek, which flows east to the Middle Fork of the Eel River.

Covelo is the location of the Covelo American Viticultural Area.

Climate
According to the Köppen Climate Classification system, Covelo has a hot-summer Mediterranean climate, abbreviated Csa on climate maps. Covelo also has a four-season climate, with the dry part of the year during summer and the rainy part in the winter. Winters are also mild in Covelo. Although snow often falls on the nearby mountains such as Anthony Peak in the winter, it rarely falls in the valley. Diurnal temperature variation is strong year round, albeit the most severe in summer. During winter, the variation still results in very frequent air frosts.

History
Covelo began in 1860, with the opening of the town's first store. The post office opened in 1870. Some sources claim that the town was named after a village in Switzerland. However, there is no village in Switzerland by that name. Covelo may be a misspelling of Covolo, a fort in Pederobba, Veneto, Italy, which is near Switzerland. Alternatively, it could be named after Covelo, a village in Galicia, Spain.

Demographics

2010
At the 2010 census Covelo had a population of 1,255. The racial makeup of Covelo was 611 (48.7%) White, 14 (1.1%) African American, 475 (37.8%) Native American, 10 (0.8%) Asian, 0 (0.0%) Pacific Islander, 49 (3.9%) from other races, and 96 (7.6%) from two or more races. Hispanic or Latino of any race were 163 people (13.0%).

The census reported that 1,247 people (99.4% of the population) lived in households, no one lived in non-institutionalized group quarters and 8 (0.6%) were institutionalized.

There were 481 households, 148 (30.8%) had children under the age of 18 living in them, 146 (30.4%) were opposite-sex married couples living together, 81 (16.8%) had a female householder with no husband present, 56 (11.6%) had a male householder with no wife present.  There were 70 (14.6%) unmarried opposite-sex partnerships, and 0 (0%) same-sex married couples or partnerships. 148 households (30.8%) were one person and 53 (11.0%) had someone living alone who was 65 or older. The average household size was 2.59.  There were 283 families (58.8% of households); the average family size was 3.25.

The age distribution was 339 people (27.0%) under the age of 18, 105 people (8.4%) aged 18 to 24, 320 people (25.5%) aged 25 to 44, 299 people (23.8%) aged 45 to 64, and 192 people (15.3%) who were 65 or older.  The median age was 35.8 years. For every 100 females, there were 97.3 males.  For every 100 females age 18 and over, there were 99.6 males.

There were 542 housing units at an average density of 75.9 per square mile, of the occupied units 314 (65.3%) were owner-occupied and 167 (34.7%) were rented. The homeowner vacancy rate was 2.2%; the rental vacancy rate was 3.4%.  791 people (63.0% of the population) lived in owner-occupied housing units and 456 people (36.3%) lived in rental housing units.

2000
At the 2000 census there were 1,175 people, 442 households, and 301 families in the CDP. The racial makeup of the CDP was 50.21% White, 0.85% Black or African American, 40.26% Native American, 0.34% Asian, 0.17% Pacific Islander, 1.96% from other races, and 6.21% from two or more races.  8.09% of the population were Hispanic or Latino of any race.
Of the 442 households 29.4% had children under the age of 18 living with them, 43.2% were married couples living together, 20.1% had a female householder with no husband present, and 31.7% were non-families. 26.0% of households were one person and 7.5% were one person aged 65 or older.  The average household size was 2.66 and the average family size was 3.17.

The age distribution was 28.9% under the age of 18, 8.9% from 18 to 24, 23.1% from 25 to 44, 27.1% from 45 to 64, and 12.2% 65 or older.  The median age was 36 years. For every 100 females, there were 92.9 males.  For every 100 females age 18 and over, there were 90.4 males.

The median household income was $27,639 and the median family income  was $31,875. Males had a median income of $21,146 versus $17,014 for females. The per capita income for the CDP was $12,628.  About 17.1% of families and 27.1% of the population were below the poverty line, including 36.4% of those under age 18 and 10.8% of those age 65 or over.

Politics

Education
Round Valley Elementary and Round Valley High School serve as the town's schools. There is also a charter school: Eel River Charter School.

Notable people

 Michelle Lambert, pop singer
 Thomas J. and Joseph M. Long, brothers who co-founded Longs Drugs Stores; born and raised in Covelo

References

Census-designated places in Mendocino County, California
Populated places established in 1860
Census-designated places in California
1860 establishments in California